I Found the Sun Again is the eighth studio album by Steve Lukather, released by The Players Club (Mascot Label Group). It was released on February 26, 2021, the same day as his bandmate from Toto, Joseph Williams, released his album Denizen Tenant under the same label.

This is Lukather's first solo studio album in eight years, following Transition (2013), marking the longest gap between two albums to date.

Background
The then current lineup of Toto played their last show on October 20, 2019, before breaking. Tensions were rising within the band and its management because of a lawsuit Susan Porcaro-Goings (Jeff Porcaro's widow) had against Lukather and David Paich, the sole directors of Toto Corporation, because she hadn't been paid money due her former husband's estate. This, according to Lukather, drove a wedge between him and then-member of Toto Steve Porcaro. Furthermore, Paich's health was pretty fragile so he wasn't able to tour.

After this situation, Lukather says that him and Joseph Williams were "the only ones who wanted to keep working". As Williams was already working on a solo album, Lukather decided to release one himself too, with both of them collaborating on each other's efforts.

Recording
Lukather desired to do an old-school, early 70s vibe record. In his own words: "I wanted to see if I could do it the way we used to do it". In order to achieve that, the whole album was recorded in eight days in February 2020, "recording a song a day", with no rehearsals, demos, click tracks or computers. As claimed by Lukather: "all that stuff you're hearing is being played live", including the solos. There were "very minimal overdubs", specifically some double-guitar parts and the vocals. In an interview with MusicRadar, Lukather described the recording process as the easiest and most enjoyable of his career to date.

Furthermore, Lukather says that "not everything was written out". Jeff Babko and him had co-written some stuff as a "good road map", plus "some stuff that we figured that was needed in the songs and the right voicings", but the majority of the work was improvised.

The band hired for the recordings included Gregg Bissonette on drums, Jorgen Carlsson and John Pierce on bass, and David Paich and Jeff Babko on keyboards. Then, in Lukather's words, Joseph Williams "took it home and layered a few backgrounds".

Songs
Of the eight tracks, there are five original songs, as well as three covers chosen by Lukather as "an homage to the people that I love": "The Low Spark of High Heeled Boys" by Traffic, Joe Walsh’s "Welcome To The Club" and "Bridge of Sighs" by Robin Trower. According to Lukather, he took the cover songs first "because that was gonna set the tone of what I wanted to write pretty much for the record". These three were songs that he "played in junior and high school in bands" and influenced him.

With "The Low Spark of High Heeled Boys", Lukather said that he "wanted to play and stretch out". He also denoted that this version includes "one of the greatest piano solos" that he's heard of in his life by Jeff Babko, and that David Paich plays a great "Steve Winwood organ solo". 

As stated by Lukather, Walsh "really dug" the cover of "Welcome to the Club" included in the album. 

About "Bridge of Sighs", Lukather said that he chose that song because "Robin [Trower] doesn't get enough love" and he "wanted to capture that era when it was recorded in the early '70s". He has also affirmed that it's a great and fun song to play, that he loves the lyrics and the vibe of the song, and that "not a lot of people have done it" as far as he knows.

Looking at the original songs, the album starts with "Along for the Ride". Lukather has indicated that he wanted it to be punchy and that he "didn’t want people to think that I’d lost my rock and roll sense". He has also acknowledged that "there's probably a bit of Jeff Beck in there". Andy Greene of Rolling Stone has wrote that the lyrics of this song show the "frustration and anger he’s felt over the past couple of years", alluding to the lawsuit and the end of the previous incarnation of Toto.

According to Greene, "things get even more bitter on 'Serpent Soul, the next song on the album. Lukather said about it that "we wanted to just write something swampy" and that it's his tribute to Little Feat.

Critical reception

Track listing

Personnel
All credits sourced from the album's liner notes.

 Steve Lukather – guitars , lead vocals 
 Jeff Babko – synths , keys , Wurli Rhodes , piano , Rhodes piano , effects , organ 
 David Paich – organ , piano 
 Gregg Bissonette – drums 
 Ringo Starr – drums, tambourine 
 Jorgen Carlsson – bass 
 John Pierce – bass 
 Joseph Williams – background vocals , all keys , strings , horn arrangements 

Technical
 Ken Freeman, Steve Lukather – production
 Joseph Williams – co-production 
 Ken Freeman – engineering, mixing
 Brendan Collins, Ryan Potesta – assistants
 Bruce Sugar – additional recording
 Gavin Lurssen, Reuben Cohen – mastering
 Roy Coch – artwork
 Alex Solca – photography

Charts

References

2021 albums
Steve Lukather albums